Jack Moisescu was a Romanian football forward of Jewish origin. On 21 November 1948 he played in the first ever CSCA București - Dinamo București derby.

International career
Jack Moisescu made one appearance at international level for Romania, when he came as a substitute at half-time, replacing Nicolae Dumitrescu in a 4–0 away victory against Albania at the 1947 Balkan Cup.

Notes

References

External links
Jack Moisescu profile at Labtof.ro

Romanian footballers
Romania international footballers
Association football forwards
Liga I players
FC Dinamo București players
Jewish footballers
Romanian Jews
Jewish Romanian sportspeople